Kirchen (Sieg) is a Verbandsgemeinde ("collective municipality") in the district of Altenkirchen, in Rhineland-Palatinate, Germany. The seat of the Verbandsgemeinde is in Kirchen.

The Verbandsgemeinde Kirchen (Sieg) consists of the following 6 Ortsgemeinden ("local municipalities"):

* seat of the Verbandsgemeinde

References

Verbandsgemeinde in Rhineland-Palatinate